Erik Andrew Kislik (born November 14, 1987) is an American chess International Master from Hillsborough, California. He achieved his first FIDE chess rating at age 20 and the International Master title at age 24. His peak FIDE rating is 2415 (May 2012).

Kislik has won a number of notable tournaments, including the First Saturday IM tournament in October 2008 and April 2009. He also won the Caissa GM tournament in February 2012 and was the joint winner of the Caissa 2012 New Year GM tournament.

Bibliography
Kislik is the author of the book Applying Logic in Chess, published by Gambit, May 2018. This book won second place for FIDE Book of the Year award, 2018.

Kislik wrote a book successor to Applying Logic in Chess called Chess Logic in Practice, published by Gambit, July 2019.

Contributions to opening theory
In a Chess.com article, International Master Bryan Smith wrote that Kislik "had 2700 level preparation" but later edited his wording to "is very strong in opening theory."

References

General references
 Kislik Earns IM Norm in Hungary
 Kislik's profile at the Internet Chess Club
 Two Chess Personalities
 Chess Hobo: Update on Kislik

External links
 

1987 births
American chess players
Chess International Masters
Living people
People from Hillsborough, California